Rodney Kirk Brown (born 1 February 1968 in New Plymouth) is a former New Zealand cricketer who played for Central Districts and Taranaki in the Hawke Cup.

References

1968 births
Living people
New Zealand cricketers
Central Districts cricketers
Cricketers from New Plymouth